List of fossiliferous stratigraphic units in Washington may refer to:

 List of fossiliferous stratigraphic units in Washington (state)
 List of fossiliferous stratigraphic units in Washington, D.C.